Extinction Event or variation may refer to:

 Extinction event or mass extinction, in biology and paleontology
 The Extinction Event (audio drama), a Doctor Who audio play
 Extinction Event, a card in the collectible card game Plants vs. Zombies Heroes
 Extinction Event (2009 novel) a spinoff novel of Primeval by Dan Abnett, see Dan Abnett bibliography
 Extinction Event (2003 comic book) a limited series comic published by WildStorm (DC), written by Robert Weinberg (author)

See also
 Extinction Level Event (disambiguation)
 Extinction (disambiguation), including events named "Extinction"
 Extinct (disambiguation)